At least three warships of Japan have borne the name Chikuma after the Chikuma River in Nagano Prefecture:

 , a  protected cruiser that was commissioned in 1912 and sunk as a target in 1935.
 , a  heavy cruiser that was commissioned in 1939 and scuttled in 1944 after the Battle off Samar.
 , an  launched in 1992

Japanese Navy ship names
Imperial Japanese Navy ship names